Pulse Ultra was a four-piece rock band from Montreal, Quebec. They were active from 1997 to 2004, releasing a major label debut album through Atlantic Records in 2002.

History

Early years (1997–2000)
Pulse Ultra was initially formed as Head Space in 1997 by guitarist Dominic Cifarelli and bassist Jeff Feldman. Drummer Maxx Zinno was added that same year. During the time, as Head Space, they had the vocalist Claudio Dongarra. Two years after Dongarra left the band, vocalist Zo Vizza, was added to the band and they made the name change to Pulse Ultra. Regarding the name, Cifarelli said "Everything right now is so fast-paced. Everything is ultra this, ultra that — ultra soft tissue to wipe your ass, and ultra light cigarettes to give you ultra cancer. Then pulse stands for being human, for life. So Pulse Ultra — it's like life amped up and taken to the next level."

Pulse Ultra's break came in 2000 when the band met Taproot, with Cifarelli later passing on one of their demos to the band. Taproot guitarist Mike DeWolf, through their management team Velvet Hammer, later got the band signed with Atlantic Records.

Major label debut and breakup (2001–2004)
After a year of songwriting, the band issued their debut album Headspace on July 16, 2002. The band would appear on the Ozzfest tour that year in support of the album's release. Subsequently, the album failed to push the band into the mainstream. In early 2004 the band went back to L.A. to work on the follow-up to "Headspace". A few months into pre-production, Atlantic Records merged with AOL Time Warner. This resulted in Pulse Ultra being dropped due to minimal record sales.

At some point during mid-2004, tensions grew between the band and Zo. Which soon after would lead Pulse Ultra to look for a new vocalist. In a post on the band's official forum, Zo stated that the split was amicable and they were all on good terms. Despite auditioning Lukas Rossi, the band would disband shortly after. They are now all involved in other projects. Dominic Cifarelli (guitarist) released his debut solo project The Chronicles of Israfel in 2007 and this project is on hiatus as he now plays bass in Scars on Broadway. Jeff Feldman is now playing bass in electronic/avant-garde band Elsiane and is working on other numerous endeavours which include soundtrack music and a project titled Hallway Memoirs. Maxx Zinno later played drums for the Los Angeles-based indie rock trio Run.

Their single "Build Your Cages" was featured on the soundtrack for Need For Speed: Hot Pursuit 2, released by EA in 2002.

Members
 Zo Vizza – vocals
 Dominic Cifarelli – guitar (The Chronicles of Israfel, ex-Scars On Broadway)
 Jeff Feldman – bass
 Maxx Zinno – drums

Discography

References

External links
 
 Pulse Ultra on Myspace

Canadian alternative metal musical groups
Musical groups from Montreal
Musical groups established in 1997
Musical groups disestablished in 2004
Atlantic Records artists